opened in Akkeshi, Hokkaidō, Japan in 1967.

See also
 Hokkaido Museum
 Akkeshi Maritime Affairs Memorial Museum
 Akkeshi Town Ōta Tonden Kaitaku Memorial Museum 
 List of Historic Sites of Japan (Hokkaidō)
 List of Cultural Properties of Japan - historical materials (Hokkaidō)

References

External links
  Akkeshi Town Historical Museum

Akkeshi, Hokkaido
Museums in Hokkaido
Museums established in 1967
1967 establishments in Japan